Sarat Pattanayak is an Indian politician hailing from Balangir in Odisha. He was elected to the 10th and 11th Lok Sabha, the lower house of the Parliament of India as a member of Parliament of the Indian National Congress party. He is currently serving as President of the Odisha Pradesh Congress Committee.

Early life, education and career 
Son of Jugul Pattanayak, born on 15 August 1956, in Saintala near Balangir. He is married to Namita Pattanayak and together they have two daughters and a son. He has completed his bachelor's degree from Rajendra College, Balangir later on pursuing a law (LLB) degree from Gangadhar Meher College & Lajpat Rai Law College, Sambalpur.

Having served as an elected Member of Lok Sabha in the then ruling P V Narasimha Rao government which gave him a close quarter view of the 1992 economic liberalisation in India, Sarat is currently serving as the Odisha Pradesh Congress Committee's president.

References

External links
Official biographical sketch in Parliament of India website

1956 births
Lok Sabha members from Odisha
India MPs 1991–1996
India MPs 1996–1997
Indian National Congress politicians from Odisha
Living people
People from Balangir district